Saint John is a seaport city of the Atlantic Ocean located on the Bay of Fundy in the province of New Brunswick, Canada. Saint John is the oldest incorporated city in Canada, established by royal charter on May 18, 1785, during the reign of King George III. The port is Canada's third-largest port by tonnage with a cargo base that includes dry and liquid bulk, break bulk, containers, and cruise. The city was the most populous in New Brunswick until the 2016 census, when it was overtaken by Moncton.

French explorer Samuel de Champlain landed at Saint John Harbour on June 24, 1604 (the feast of St. John the Baptist) and is where the Saint John River gets its name, although Mi'kmaq and Wolastoqiyik peoples lived in the region for thousands of years prior - calling the river "Wolastoq". The Saint John area was an important area for trade and defence for Acadia during the French colonial era and Fort La Tour, in the city's harbour, was a pivotal battleground during the Acadian Civil War.

After over a century of ownership disputes over the land surrounding Saint John between the French and English, the English colonists deported the French colonists in 1755 and constructed Fort Howe above the harbour in 1779. In 1785, the City of Saint John was established by uniting the two towns of Parrtown and Carleton on each side of the harbour after the arrival of thousands of refugees from the American Revolution who wished to remain British and were forced to leave their U.S. homes. Over the next century, waves of immigration via Partridge Island, especially during the Great Famine, would fundamentally change the city's demographics and culture.

History

The area has been the home of peoples of the Wabanaki Confederacy for thousands of years. The northwestern coastal region of the Bay of Fundy inhabited by the Passamaquoddy Nation, while the Saint John River valley north of the bay became the domain of the Wolastoqiyik Nation. The Mi'kmaq also ventured into the Saint John area regularly as the harbour and coast was an important hunting ground for seals. The area around the harbour, where the city is, has been traditionally called Menahkwesk by the Wolastoqiyik people, who still live in and around the city today. In pre-colonial times the Wolastoqiyik lived in mostly self-sustaining villages living largely off bass, sturgeon, salmon, corn, wild roots and berries.

Samuel de Champlain landed at Saint John Harbour in 1604, though he did not settle the area. Saint John was a key area for trade and defence for Acadia during the French colonial era. Fort La Tour in the city's harbour, was a pivotal battleground during the Acadian Civil War. At the end of the Seven Years' War, the British took the region from the French.

Population grew with immigration from the former Thirteen Colonies and Europe. In 1785, Saint John became the first incorporated city in what is now Canada. Immigration led to the building of North America's first quarantine station, Partridge Island.

The city became a shipyard of global stature. The 1851 ship  became the fastest in the world, and Robert Foulis developed the automated foghorn.

As the city grew in strategic importance to English power and capital, unrest grew among many of its working class. Black Saint Johners were forbidden from trade, fishing and voting, thus the majority of the city's Black community settled in Portland (the city's north end), which later became amalgamated with Saint John. In 1849, Canada's first labour union, the Laborer's Benevolent Association (now ILA local 273) was formed by longshoremen. From 1840 to 1860 sectarian violence was rampant in Saint John, as tensions grew in reaction to poor living conditions of poor Irish Catholics resulting in some of the worst urban riots in Canadian history. The city experienced a cholera outbreak in 1854 with the death of over 1,500 people, as well as a great fire in 1877 that destroyed 40% of the city and left 20,000 people homeless with damage exceeding $10 million (a modern value of approximately $256 million).

Geography and climate

Physical geography

Situated in the south-central portion of the province, along the north shore of the Bay of Fundy at the mouth of the Saint John River, the city is split by the south-flowing river and the east side is bordered on the north by the Kennebecasis River where it meets the Saint John River at Grand Bay. Saint John Harbour, where the two rivers meet the Bay of Fundy, is a deep water port and ice-free all year long. Partridge Island is in the harbour.

Stonehammer UNESCO Geopark, the first Geopark in North America, is centred around Saint John. The Geopark has been recognized by UNESCO as having exceptional geological significance. The park contains rock formations that date back to the Precambrian era and some of the rocks may be a billion years old.

The Saint John River itself flows into the Bay of Fundy through a narrow gorge several hundred metres wide at the centre of the city. It contains a unique phenomenon called the Reversing Falls where the diurnal tides of the bay reverse the water flow of the river for several kilometres. A series of underwater ledges at the narrowest point of this gorge also create a series of rapids.

The topography surrounding Saint John is hilly; a result of the influence of two coastal mountain ranges which run along the Bay of Fundy – the St. Croix Highlands and the Caledonia Highlands. The soil throughout the region is extremely rocky with frequent granite outcrops. The coastal plain hosts numerous freshwater lakes in the eastern, western and northern parts of the city.

In Saint John the height difference from low to high tide is approximately 8 metres (28 ft) due to the funnelling effect of the Bay of Fundy as it narrows. The Reversing Falls in Saint John, actually an area of strong rapids, provides one example of the power of these tides; at every high tide, ocean water is pushed through a narrow gorge in the middle of the city and forces the Saint John River to reverse its flow for several hours.

Neighbourhoods
 South (End) Central Peninsula—Uptown: on the east side of Saint John Harbour and the area immediately opposite on the west side are the sites of the original city. Now includes the central business district and the Trinity Royal Heritage Conservation Area, which together are referred to as Uptown.
 North End (Portland/Millidgeville): mostly the former city of Portland, formerly the site of ferry terminals. It is the site of the city's only completely French school and community centre, Centre Scolaire Communautaire Samuel-de-Champlain. It includes one of Canada's largest urban parks, Rockwood Park.
East Side: east of the Courtney Bay contains commercial retail centres and residential subdivisions. 
West Side: west of the Saint John River is collectively referred to as West Side but Lancaster was a notable former municipality.

Climate

The climate of Saint John is humid continental (Köppen climate classification Dfb). The Bay of Fundy never fully freezes, thus moderating the winter temperatures compared with inland locations. Summers are usually warm to hot, and daytime temperatures often exceed . The highest temperature recorded in a given year is usually . The confluence of cold Bay of Fundy air and inland warmer temperatures often creates onshore winds that bring periods of fog and cooler temperatures during the summer months.

Precipitation in Saint John totals about  annually and is well distributed throughout the year, although the late autumn and early winter are typically the wettest time of year. Snowfalls can often be heavy, but rain is as common as snow in winter, and it is not unusual for the ground to be snow-free even in mid-winter.

Buildings and structures

 Courtney Bay Smokestacks (each )
It is the largest office building in New Brunswick in terms of square footage and second in Atlantic Canada behind the Maritime Centre in Halifax.
 Cathedral of the Immaculate Conception (Gothic style Catholic cathedral, construction began in 1853, its spire rises to )
 City Hall 15-storey office building
 Brunswick House 14-storey office building
 Irving Building 14-storey office building
 Harbourside Senior Citizens Housing Complex 12-storey apartment building
 Harbour Building 10-storey office building
 Mercantile Centre 7-storey office building
 Chateau Saint John 8-storey hotel (112 rooms)
 City Market (built in 1876, oldest city market in North America, with an original ship's hull roof design)
 Loyalist House (built in 1817)
 Irving Oil Headquarters (2019) 11-storey office building

Demographics

Ethnicity and religion

Historically, as one of Canada's main ports, Saint John has been a centre for immigration from all over the world. The city was incorporated in the late 1700s after more than 3,300 Black Loyalist refugees came to Saint John along with more than 10,000 White refugees after the American Revolution. In the years between 1815 and 1867, when immigration of that era passed its peak, more than 150,000 immigrants from Ireland came to Saint John dramatically changing the city.

Those who came in the earlier period were largely tradesmen, and many stayed in Saint John, becoming the backbone of its builders. But when the Great Famine of Ireland raged between 1845 and 1849, huge waves of famine refugees flooded the city's shores. It is estimated that between 1845 and 1847, some 30,000 arrived, more people than were living in the city at the time. In 1847, dubbed "Black 47", one of the worst years of the famine, some 16,000 immigrants, most of them from Ireland, arrived at Partridge Island, the immigration and quarantine station at the mouth of Saint John Harbour.

As of the 2021 census, approximately 85.3% of the residents were white, while 11.9% were visible minorities and 2.8% were Indigenous. The largest visible minority groups were Black (2.9%), South Asian (2.6%), Arab (1.7%), Chinese (1.5%), and Filipino (1.0%). 87.2% of residents spoke English as a mother tongue. Other common first languages were French (3.7%), Arabic (1.5%) Chinese languages (1.0%) and Tagalog (0.5%).

58.5% of residents were Christian, down from 79.6% in 2011. 29.7% were Catholic, 20.6% were Protestant, 5.1% were Christian n.o.s, and 3.0% were other Christian denominations or related traditions. 36.0% of the population were non-religious or secular, up from 18.4% in 2011. Other religions accounted for 5.5% of the population, up from 2.0% in 2011. The largest non-Christian religions were Islam (3.1%) and Hinduism (1.0%).

Municipal government

Saint John is one of five chartered cities in Canada, giving it unique legislative powers.

The council consists of the mayor and ten councillors.

Economy

Saint John derived its economy from maritime industries such as shipping, fishing and shipbuilding. Saint John has a long history of shipbuilding at the city's dry dock, which is one of the largest in the world. Since 2003 shipbuilding has ended on the scale it once was, forcing the city to adopt a new economic strategy. The University of New Brunswick, the New Brunswick Museum and the New Brunswick Community College are important institutions, and along with Radian6, Horizon Health Network and many others, they are a part of Saint John's fast-growing research and information-technology sectors. As the city moves away from its industrial past it now begins to capitalize on the growing sector of tourism, hosting over 1.5 million visitors a year and 200,000 cruise ship visitors a year, creating a renaissance in the city's historic downtown (locally known as uptown). Many small businesses have moved into Uptown and large scale waterfront developments are underway, such as the Fundy Quay (condo, hotel and office space), Saint John Law Courts, and the Three Sisters Harbourfront condos.

Arts and culture
The arts and culture sector plays a large role in Saint John's economy. The Imperial Theatre is home to the highly acclaimed Saint John Theatre Company, and the Symphony New Brunswick and hosts a large collection of plays, concerts and other stage productions year-round. Harbour Station entertainment complex is home to the Saint John Sea Dogs of the QMJHL.

Art galleries in Saint John cover the uptown, more than any other Atlantic Canadian city. Artists like Miller Brittain and Fred Ross have made Uptown Saint John their home, and now the torch has been passed to artists like Gerard Collins, Cliff Turner and Peter Salmon and their respective galleries. Uptown art galleries also include the Paris Crew, Trinity Galleries, Citadel Gallery, Handworks Gallery and the Saint John Arts Centre (SJAC). The SJAC in the Carnegie Building hosts art exhibits, workshops, local songwriters' circles and other shows too small to be featured at the grand Imperial Theatre.

Heavy industry
Saint John maintains industrial infrastructure in the city's East side such as Canada's largest oil refinery as well as the country's largest dry dock. Capitalist K.C. Irving and his family built his unfettered industrial conglomerate in the city by buying up mills, shipyards, media outlets, and other industrial infrastructure during the 20th century, and still continue to this day. Today Irving dominates the city and province with stakes in oil, forestry, shipbuilding, media and transportation. Irving companies remain dominant employers in the region with North America's first deepwater oil terminal, a pulp mill, a paper mill and a tissue paper plant.

Other important economic activity in the city is generated by the Port of Saint John.

Saint John has a long history of brewers, such as Simeon Jones, The Olands, and James Ready. The city is now home to Moosehead Breweries, James Ready Brewing Co., Big Tide Brewing Co., Picaroon's and other craft brewers. The Moosehead Brewery (established in 1867, is Canada's only nationally distributed independent brewery [M. Nicholson]), James Ready Brewing Co., the New Brunswick Power Corporation which operates three electrical generating stations in the region including the Point Lepreau Nuclear Generating Station, Bell Aliant which operates out of the former New Brunswick Telephone headquarters, the Horizon Health Network, which operates 5 hospitals in the Saint John area, and numerous information technology companies. There are also a number of call centres which were established in the 1990s under provincial government incentives.

Maritime industries

Saint John is a major Canadian port, and the only city on the Bay of Fundy. Until the first decade of the 21st century, Canada's largest shipyard (Irving Shipbuilding) had been an important employer in the city. During the 1980s-early 1990s the shipyard was responsible for building 9 of the 12  multi-purpose patrol frigates for the Canadian Navy. However, the Irving family closed the shipyard in 2003 and centralized in Halifax leaving the Saint John dry dock sitting idle.

Ecological research on surrounding marine life of the Bay of Fundy and the Saint John and Kennebecasis Rivers is centred in the city. The University of New Brunswick's Marine Biology department in Saint John as well as local NGO's and the federal Department of Fisheries and Oceans heads the majority of research and monitoring work on marine life and environments.

Traditional fisheries (lobster, scallops etc.) still make up the livelihood for many Saint Johners today. Aquaculture, primarily Atlantic Salmon farming, has grown to be a major employer in the region as the decline of other traditional wild fisheries has unfolded in recent decades. Cooke Aquaculture, one of the largest companies in the industry is headquartered in Saint John.

Prior to the opening of the St. Lawrence Seaway in 1959, the Port of Saint John functioned as the winter port for Montreal, Quebec when shipping was unable to traverse the sea ice in the Gulf of St. Lawrence and St. Lawrence River. The Canadian Pacific Railway opened a line to Saint John from Montreal in 1889 across the state of Maine and transferred the majority of its trans-Atlantic passenger and cargo shipping to the port during the winter months. The port fell into decline following the seaway opening and the start of year-round icebreaker services in the 1960s. In 1994 CPR left Saint John when it sold the line to shortline operator New Brunswick Southern Railway. The Canadian National Railway still services Saint John with a secondary mainline from Moncton. Despite these setbacks, Port Saint John is the largest port by volume in Eastern Canada, at about 28 million metric tonnes of cargo per year, including containers and bulk cargo.

Military
Besides being the location of several historical forts, such as Fort Howe, Fort Dufferin, Fort Latour, and the Carleton Martello Tower, Saint John is the location of a number of reserve units of the Canadian Forces.

Naval Reserve
 HMCS Brunswicker
37 Canadian Brigade Group
 3rd Field Artillery Regiment, RCA: Regimental headquarters and 115th Field Battery (The Loyal Company)
 Royal New Brunswick Regiment (Carleton & York): B Company
 37 Signal Regiment: Det Saint John, and 2 Squadron
 37 Service Battalion: Battalion headquarters and a composite logistics company

Labour

Canada's first trade union
Saint John is often described as the birthplace of unionism in Canada and is one of the few pre-capitalist colonial settlements in North America. The city has a history of labour achievements and sparked the Canadian labour movement with Canada's first trade union, the Labourers' Benevolent Association (now International Longshoremen's Association Local 273). In 1849 the union was formed when Saint John's longshoremen banded together to lobby for regular pay and a shorter workday. One of their first resolutions was to apply to the city council for permission to erect the bell, which would announce the beginning and end of the labourers' 10-hour workday. As the bell shears were hardly finished when capitalists and merchants in the city objected to the bell and successfully lobbied city hall to keep the bell from being put up. But then, citizens and longshoremen defied the order and erected a larger bell and merchants withdrew their opposition to the "Labourers' Bell". ILA Local 273 remain one of the city's strongest trade unions to this day.

The Saint John Street Railwaymen's strike and riot of 1914

The 1914 Saint John street railway strike (sometimes called the Saint John street railwaymen's strike) was a strike by workers on the street railway system in the city which lasted from July 22 to 24, 1914, with rioting by Saint John inhabitants occurring on July 23 and 24. The strike was important for shattering the image of Saint John as a conservative town dominated primarily by ethnic and religious (rather than class) divisions, and highlighting tensions between railway industrialists and the local working population.

October 14, 1976: The Saint John General Strike
The Saint John General Strike of 1976 was a result of the Bill C-73 passed by Prime Minister of Canada, Pierre Elliott Trudeau, and the House of Commons in Ottawa on October 14, 1975. This bill limited wage increases to 8% the first year, 6% the second year, and 4% the third year after its enactment. Most provinces of Canada accepted the bill by spring of 1976, but within eighteen months they began to withdraw from the program. After its introduction in 1975, it was not until 1976 that the Anti-Inflation Board (AIB) began to roll back workers' wages. The employees of Irving Pulp and Paper, members of the Canadian Paper Workers Union, were among the first to experience the roll backs implemented by the AIB. The paper workers were required to give back to the employer 9.8% of their previous wage increase the first year, and 11% the second year. The Atlantic Sugar Refinery workers of the Bakery and Confectionary Workers International Union of America soon felt the burden as well. The majority of workers within Saint John were influenced by the AIB by January 1976. On February 5, 1976, the Saint John District and the Labour Council held a conference to plan an organized opposition to the AIB. Fifty-two people came to the meeting as representatives of twenty-six unions in Saint John. The council was led by the Labour Council president, George Vair. They began by educating those present on wage control legislation, but swiftly transitioned into rallying and demonstrating in opposition throughout the city. Five thousand marched from numerous ends of the town to King Square. All major industries in Saint John were shut down.

The Irving Oil Refinery strike, 1994–1996
On May 12, 1994, at 4:30 pm, members of Local 691 of the Communications, Energy and Paperworkers (CEP) union at the Irving Oil Ltd. Refinery went on strike. At this time the refinery's management took over its operations. Irving had argued the refinery might have to shut down and had to bring in a bevy of rollbacks to the workers’ pay and benefits and other changes to the collective agreement. Local 691 argued Irving simply wished to lengthen the work week without paying workers overtime rates. The strike lasted 27 months and was based on Irving's demands for flexibility of the workers to ensure the refinery was competitive. The strike is seen as symbolic of a rollback of labour and democratic collective bargaining rights that have been in decline across North America.

Transportation

Air
Flights are offered by Sunwing Airlines (seasonal) and Air Canada (Air Canada Express and Air Canada Rouge). In 2011, WestJet decided to withdraw from the Saint John Airport. Quebec-based Pascan Aviation announced its expansion into Saint John in late 2012, with direct flights from Saint John to Quebec City, Newfoundland, and other destinations beginning in September 2012. Porter Airlines flies once daily from Saint John, to Ottawa and Toronto Island Airport.

Highways
The main highway in the city is the Saint John Throughway (Route 1). Route 1 extends west to the United States border, and northeast towards both Prince Edward Island and Nova Scotia. A second major highway, Route 7, connects Saint John with Fredericton.

Rail
The Reversing Falls Railway Bridge carries rail traffic for the New Brunswick Southern Railway on the route from Saint John to Maine. Saint John was serviced by the "Atlantic" Line of Via Rail passenger service. Passenger rail service in Saint John was discontinued in December 1994, although the Canadian National Railway and New Brunswick Southern Railway continue to provide freight service.

Port and ferries
Port Saint John is located where the Saint John River meets the Atlantic Ocean. Thus both the ocean and the river system is navigable from Saint John docks. Bay Ferries operates a ferry service, across the Bay of Fundy to Digby, Nova Scotia. The Summerville to Millidgeville Ferry, a free propeller (as opposed to cable) ferry service operated by the New Brunswick Department of Transportation, connects the Millidgeville neighbourhood with Summerville, New Brunswick, across the Kennebecasis River on the Kingston Peninsula.

Public transit
Saint John Transit is the largest transit system in New Brunswick in both area coverage and ridership. Bus service is provided by Saint John Transit (Greater Saint John Area) and Maritime Bus (Inter-city). Acadian Lines used to operate regular inter-city bus services between New Brunswick, Prince Edward Island, Nova Scotia, Bangor, as well as Rivière-du-Loup, Quebec (connecting with Orléans Express). Maritime Bus has since replaced Acadian Lines as the regional bus service.

Culture
The city has always been a traditional hub for the arts on the east coast, boasting many notable artists, actors and musicians, including Walter Pidgeon, Donald Sutherland, Louis B. Mayer, and Miller Brittain.
What is considered the golden age of the Saint John arts community was during the post-war era from 1940 to 1970 when the city produced renowned artists and writers such as poet Kay Smith, painters Jack Humphrey, Miller Brittain, Bruno Bobak, Fred Ross, and sculptor John Hooper and folk-singer Tom Connors. Poet Bliss Carman once wrote about Saint John, "All the beauty and mystery Of life were there, adventure bold, Youth, and the glamour of the sea, And all its sorrows old."

Dance, music, and theatre

 Comhaltas Saint John: Comhaltas Ceoltóirí Éireann was founded in Dublin, Ireland, in 1951. Its mandate is to promote traditional Irish music and culture, and there are more than 400 branches around the world. The Saint John branch of Comhaltas is the easternmost chapter in Canada.
 JP Collins Celtic Festival: is an Irish festival celebrating Saint John's Irish heritage. The festival is named for a young Irish doctor James Patrick Collins who worked on Partridge Island quarantine station tending to sick Irish immigrants before he died there himself.
 Before the Mast: an a cappella men's vocal group that performs sea "shanties" from New Brunswick's past
 InterAction School of Performing Arts
 New Brunswick Youth Orchestra
 Open Arts – a series featuring post-classical and experimental music
 Saint John Rotary Boys' Choir – a boys' choir founded in 1965
 Saint John String Quartet – performs an annual chamber music concert series
 Symphony New Brunswick (SNB)- the province's only professional quality symphony orchestra. 
 TD Station – Formerly Harbour Station, is a venue for large indoor concerts and events
 The Imperial Theatre
 Saint John Free Public Library, Library Millennium Artplace
 Third Space Gallery
 The Fundy Fringe Festival
 The Atlantic Repertory Company
 The Saint John Theatre Company
 The BMO Studio Theatre

Museums

 Hatheway Labour Exhibit Centre
 Barbour's General Store
 New Brunswick Black History Society 
 Carleton Martello Tower
 Fort Howe
 Loyalist House
 New Brunswick Museum: Canada's first public museum.
 Saint John Firefighters Museum
 Saint John Jewish Historical Museum

National Historic sites

 Carleton Martello Tower
 Fort Charnisay (also sometimes called Fort Menagoueche or Fort Frederick)
 Fort Howe
 Imperial Theatre
 Loyalist House
 Saint John City Market
 Partridge Island (Saint John County)
 Prince William Streetscape 
 Bank of New Brunswick
 Fort La Tour

Music
Early settlers influenced music in Saint John from the time the area had been a series of forts for the English and French colonists. Working class fishers, labourers and shipbuilders carried Maritime traditions and folk songs with kitchen parties and outdoor gatherings. But musical high culture was captured by the wealthy. New Brunswick's solicitor-general 1784–1808, Ward Chipman Sr was known to have fancy soirées at his home with all the latest songs from London. A notable Loyalist musician, Stephen Humbert, moved in 1783 from New Jersey to Saint John and opened a Sacred Vocal Music School. In 1801 Humbert published Union Harmony, the first Canadian music book in English. The Mechanics' Institute, built in 1840, was the first large-scale platform for comic opera and concerts. In 1950 The Saint John Symphony was founded by Kelsey Jones; by 1983 the organization became Symphony New Brunswick. Some musicians from Saint John include Berkley Chadwick, Stompin' Tom Connors, Ken Tobias, Blank Banshee, Stevedore Steve, Jane Coop, Bruce Holder, Frances James, the songwriter Michael F. Kelly, Ned Landry, the composer and teacher Edward Betts Manning, Paul Murray, Catherine McKinnon, Patricia Rideout, Philip Thomson, and the tenor and choir conductor Gordon Wry.

Music festivals have long been a part of the city's cultural scene. New Brunswick's Music Festival was held in Saint John every Spring in the early- to mid-20th century. As the city's music changed with the times, so did its festivals. Other popular festivals include the now defunct Festival By The Sea and Salty Jam catering to various genres of pop music.

The Area 506 music festival is held every New Brunswick Day long-weekend at Long Wharf on Saint John Harbour. The festival is set up with shipping containers from the port with vendors from New Brunswick companies to promote local business. A main stage area is also set up for night time shows with local acts as well as major groups. Major bands to have played Area 506 include Tegan and Sara, Stars, Bahamas, Interpol, and Arkells. Each year the festival also includes a bevy of bands coming out of the Saint John music scene. Quality Block Party music festival hosts independent New Brunswick musicians in smaller venues throughout uptown Saint John. The festival gets its name from the old quality block on Germain Street.

Sport

The following teams are based in Saint John:
 The Quebec Major Junior Hockey League's Saint John Sea Dogs 2011 & 2022 Canadian Hockey League Memorial Cup Champions.
 The National Basketball League of Canada's Saint John Riptide
 The New Brunswick Rugby Union's Saint John Irish
 The New Brunswick Rugby Union's Saint John Trojans
 The New Brunswick Senior Baseball League's Saint John Alpines

The following sporting events have been held here:
 The Saint John Flames of the AHL played here from 1993 to 2003, winning the Calder Cup in 2000–2001.
 1999 & 2014 World Curling Championships
 1998 World Junior Figure Skating Championships
 1997 AHL All-Star Game
 1995 Skate Canada International
 1988 World Blitz Chess Championship
 1985 Canada Games

Education

In 1964, the University of New Brunswick created UNB Saint John in buildings throughout the uptown CBD. In 1968, UNBSJ opened a new campus in the city's Tucker Park neighbourhood. This campus has undergone expansion over the years and is the fastest-growing component of the UNB system, with many new buildings constructed from the 1970s to the first decade of the 21st century. A trend in recent years has been a growth in the number of international students. The city also hosts a New Brunswick Community College campus in the East End of the city. There has also been a satellite campus of Dalhousie Medical School added within the UNBSJ campus in 2010, instructing 30 medical students each year.

In the fall of 2007, a report commissioned by the provincial government recommended UNBSJ and the NBCC be reformed and consolidated into a new polytechnic post-secondary institute. The proposal immediately came under heavy criticism and led to the organizing of several protests in the uptown area, citing the diminishment of UNB as a nationally accredited university, the reduction in accessibility to receive degrees – and these are only a couple of the reasons why the community was enraged by the recommendation. Support for keeping UNBSJ as it was, and expanding the university under its current structure, fell slightly below 90%. Seeing too much political capital would be lost, and several Saint John MPs were likely not to support the initiative if the policies recommended by the report were legislated, the government abandoned the commission's report and created an intra-provincial post-secondary commission.

Saint John is served by two school boards: Anglophone South School District schools and Francophone Sud School District (based out of Dieppe, New Brunswick) for the city's only Francophone school, Centre-Scolaire-Communautaire Samuel-de-Champlain. Saint John is also home to Canada's oldest publicly funded school, Saint John High School. The other high schools in the city are Harbour View High School, St. Malachy's High School, and Simonds High School.

Notable people 

 Louis B. Mayer - Canadian-American film producer and co-founder of Metro-Goldwyn-Mayer studios (MGM), grew up in Saint John, New Brunswick.
 Walter Pidgeon - Canadian-American actor. Born in Saint John, New Brunswick. Walter Pidgeon has a star on the Hollywood Walk of Fame.
 Donald Sutherland - Canadian actor whose film career spans over eight decades. Sutherland was born 17 July 1935, in Saint John, New Brunswick.

Twin/sister cities

  Koper, Slovenia
  Shantou, Guangdong, China

See also

List of people from Saint John, New Brunswick
Bank of New Brunswick: the first chartered bank in Canada.
The Paris Crew: Canada's first international sporting champions (rowing), 1867.

Notes

References

External links

 
1631 establishments in the French colonial empire
Acadian history
Cities in New Brunswick
Communities in Greater Saint John
Conflicts in Nova Scotia
Populated coastal places in Canada
Populated places established in 1631
New Brunswick populated places on the Saint John River (Bay of Fundy)
Port cities and towns on the Canadian Atlantic coast